Wandoor Beach is a beach located 25 km south-east of Port Blair, in South Andaman district.

One of the major attraction of the place is Mahatma Gandhi Marine National Park. The area has abundance of amphibian and marine wildlife. Saltwater crocodiles are often seen on shores.

A jetty which connects near by Islands like Jolly Buoy Island, Red Skin Island, Alexandra Island etc.

Wandoor is also known for its backwater, lagoons and Mangroov forest.

The population of the village is 1,437 as per 2011 census. Major population of the village is with fishing and agriculture crops like paddy and coconut etc.

References 

Cities and towns in Malappuram district
Nilambur area